The Westminster system or Westminster model is a type of parliamentary government that incorporates a series of procedures for operating a legislature. This concept was first developed in England.

Key aspects of the system include an executive branch made up of members of the legislature, and that is responsible to the legislature; the presence of parliamentary opposition parties; and a ceremonial head of state who is different from the head of government. The term comes from the Palace of Westminster, the current seat of the Parliament of the United Kingdom. The Westminster system is often contrasted with the presidential system that originated in the United States, or with the semi-presidential system, based on the government of France.

The Westminster system is used, or was once used, in the national and subnational legislatures of most former colonies of the British Empire, upon gaining self-government (with the exception of the United States and Cyprus), beginning with the first of the Canadian provinces in 1848 and the six Australian colonies between 1855 and 1890. It is the form of government bequeathed to New Zealand, and former British Hong Kong. The State of Israel adopted a largely Westminster-inspired system of government upon declaring independence from the British Mandate of Palestine. However, some former colonies have since adopted either the presidential system (Nigeria for example) or a hybrid system (like South Africa) as their form of government.

Characteristics

The Westminster system of government may include some of the following features:

 A sovereign or head of state who functions as the nominal or legal and constitutional holder of executive power, and holds numerous reserve powers, but whose daily duties mainly consist of performing ceremonial functions. Examples include King Charles III, the governors-general in the Commonwealth realms, or the presidents of many countries, and state or provincial governors in federal systems. Exceptions to this are Ireland and Israel, whose presidents are de jure and de facto ceremonial, and the latter possesses no reserve powers whatsoever.
 A head of government (or head of the executive), known as the prime minister (PM), premier, chief minister or first minister. While the head of state appoints the head of government, constitutional convention suggests that a majority of elected members of parliament must support the person appointed. If more than half of elected parliamentarians belong to the same political party, then the parliamentary leader of that party typically is appointed. An exception to this was Israel, in which direct prime-ministerial elections were made in 1996, 1999 and 2001.
 An executive branch led by the head of government usually made up of members of the legislature with the senior members of the executive in a cabinet adhering to the principle of cabinet collective responsibility; such members execute executive authority on behalf of the nominal or theoretical executive authority.
 An independent, non-partisan civil service that advises on, and implements, decisions of the elected government. Civil servants hold permanent appointments and can expect merit-based selection processes and continuity of employment when governments change.
 A parliamentary opposition (in a multi-party system) with an official leader of the opposition.
 A legislature, often bicameral, with at least one elected house—although unicameral systems also exist. Traditionally, the lower house is elected using first-past-the-post from single-member districts, which is still more common, although some use a system of proportional representation (e.g. Israel, New Zealand), parallel voting (e.g. Japan), or preferential voting (e.g. Papua New Guinea, Australia).
 A lower house of parliament with an ability to dismiss a government by "withholding (or blocking) supply" (rejecting a budget), passing a motion of no confidence, or defeating a confidence motion.
 A parliament that can be dissolved and snap elections called at any time.
 Parliamentary privilege, which allows the legislature to discuss any issue it deems relevant without fear of consequences stemming from defamatory statements or records thereof.
 Minutes of meetings, often known as Hansard, including an ability for the legislature to strike discussion from these minutes.
 The ability of courts to address silence or ambiguity in the statutory law through the development of common law. Another parallel system of legal principles also exists known as equity. Exceptions to this include India, Quebec in Canada, and Scotland in the UK, among other countries who  mix common law with other legal systems.

Most of the procedures of the Westminster system originated with the conventions, practices, and precedents of the Parliament of the United Kingdom, which form a part of what is known as the Constitution of the United Kingdom. Unlike the uncodified British constitution, most countries that use the Westminster system have codified the system, at least in part, in a written constitution.

However, uncodified conventions, practices, and precedents continue to play a significant role in most countries, as many constitutions do not specify important elements of procedure. For example, some older constitutions using the Westminster system do not mention the existence of the cabinet or the prime minister, because these offices were taken for granted by the authors of these constitutions. Sometimes these conventions, reserve powers, and other influences collide in times of crisis and in such times the weaknesses of the unwritten aspects of the Westminster system, as well as the strengths of the Westminster system's flexibility, are put to the test. As an illustrative example, in the Australian constitutional crisis of 1975, the Governor-General of Australia, Sir John Kerr, dismissed Prime Minister Gough Whitlam and replaced him with opposition leader Malcolm Fraser.

Summary of the typical structure of the Westminster model

Operation
The pattern of executive functions within a Westminster system is quite complex. In essence, the head of state, usually a monarch or president, is a ceremonial figurehead who is the theoretical, nominal or  source of executive power within the system. In practice, such a figure does not actively exercise executive powers, even though executive authority is nominally exercised in their name.

The head of government, usually called the prime minister or premier, will ideally have the support of a majority in the responsible house, and must, in any case, be able to ensure the existence of no absolute majority against the government. If the parliament passes a motion of no confidence, or refuses to pass an important bill such as the budget, then the government must either resign so that a different government can be appointed or seek a parliamentary dissolution so that new general elections may be held in order to re-confirm or deny the government's mandate.

Executive authority within a Westminster system is de jure exercised by the cabinet as a whole, along with more junior ministers, however, in effect, the head of government dominates the executive as the head of government is ultimately the person from whom the head of state will take advice (by constitutional convention) on the exercise of executive power, including the appointment and dismissal of cabinet members. This results in the situation where individual cabinet members in effect serve at the pleasure of the prime minister. Thus the cabinet is strongly subordinate to the prime minister as they can be replaced at any time, or can be moved ("demoted") to a different portfolio in a cabinet reshuffle for "underperforming".

In the United Kingdom, the sovereign theoretically holds executive authority, even though the prime minister and the cabinet effectively implement executive powers. In a parliamentary republic like India, the president is the  executive, even though executive powers are essentially instituted by the prime minister and the Council of Ministers.

As an example, the prime minister and cabinet (as the de facto executive body in the system) generally must seek the permission of the head of state when carrying out executive functions. If, for instance the British prime minister wished to dissolve Parliament in order for a general election to take place, the prime minister is constitutionally bound to request permission from the sovereign in order to attain such a wish. However, the sovereign in modern times has virtually always followed the advice of their prime minister without their own agency, this owes to the fact that the British sovereign is a constitutional monarch; he or she abides by the advice of his or her ministers, except when executing reserve powers in times of crisis. The sovereign's power to appoint and dismiss governments, appoint cabinet ministers to serve in the government, appoint diplomats, declare war, and to sign treaties (among other powers de jure held by the sovereign) is known as the royal prerogative, which in modern times is exercised by the sovereign solely on the advice of the Prime Minister.

This custom also occurs in other countries are regions around the world using the Westminster System, as a legacy of British colonial rule. In Commonwealth realms such as Canada, Australia and New Zealand, the day-to-day functions that would be exercised by the sovereign personally in the United Kingdom are instead exercised by the governor-general. In such nations, the prime minister is obligated to formally seek permission from the governor-general when implementing executive decisions, in a manner similar to the British system.

An analogous scenario also exists in republics in the Commonwealth of Nations, such as India or Trinidad and Tobago, where there is a president who functions similarly to a governor-general.

An unusual case lies in Israel and Japan, where the respective prime ministers have the full legal power to implement executive decisions, and presidential (in Israel) or imperial (in Japan) approval is not required; the prime ministers of these nations are fully the de jure source of executive authority, and not the head of state.

The head of state will often hold meetings with the head of government and cabinet, as a means of keeping abreast of governmental policy and as a means of advising, consulting and warning ministers in their actions. Such a practice takes place in the United Kingdom and India. In the UK, the sovereign holds confidential weekly meetings with the prime minister to discuss governmental policy and to offer his or her opinions and advice on issues of the day. In India, the prime minister is constitutionally bound to hold regular sessions with the president, in a similar manner to the aforementioned British practice. In essence, the head of state, as the theoretical executive authority, "reigns but does not rule". This phrase means that the head of state's role in government is generally ceremonial and as a result does not directly institute executive powers. The reserve powers of the head of state are sufficient to ensure compliance with some of their wishes. However, the extent of such powers varies from one country to another and is often a matter of controversy.

Such an executive arrangement first emerged in the United Kingdom. Historically, the British sovereign held and directly exercised all executive authority. George I of Great Britain (reigned 1714 to 1727) was the first British monarch to delegate some executive powers to a prime minister and a cabinet of the ministers, largely because he was also the monarch of Hanover in Germany and did not speak English fluently. Over time, further arrangements continued to allow the execution of executive authority on the sovereign's behalf and more and more de facto power ended up lying in the Prime Minister's hands. Such a concept was reinforced in The English Constitution (1876) by Walter Bagehot, who distinguished between the separate "dignified" and "efficient" functions of government. The sovereign should be a focal point for the nation ("dignified"), while the PM and cabinet actually undertook executive decisions ("efficient").

Electoral system, ministers and officials 
The electoral system is often set out in a Representation of the People Act. Common ministerial titles include parliamentary secretary and under-secretary. Ministers are supported by private secretaries and government departments are run by permanent secretaries, principal secretaries or chief secretaries.

Role of the head of state
The head of state or their representative (such as a governor-general) formally appoints as the head of government whoever commands the confidence of the lower or sole house of the legislature and invites him or her to form a government. In the UK, this is known as kissing hands. Although the dissolution of the legislature and the call for new elections is formally performed by the head of state, the head of state, by convention, acts according to the wishes of the head of government.

A president, monarch, or governor-general might possess clearly significant reserve powers. Examples of the use of such powers include the Australian constitutional crisis of 1975 and the Canadian King–Byng affair in 1926. The Lascelles Principles were an attempt to create a convention to cover similar situations, but have not been tested in practice. Because of differences in their written constitutions, the formal powers of monarchs, governors-general, and presidents vary greatly from one country to another. However, as sovereigns and governors-general are not elected, and some presidents may not be directly elected by the people, they are often shielded from any public disapproval stemming from unilateral or controversial use of their powers.

In many Commonwealth realms a governor-general formally represents the monarch, who is usually absent from the realm. In such countries, the identity of the "head of state" may be unclear.

Cabinet government

In the book The English Constitution, Walter Bagehot emphasised the divide of the constitution into two components, the Dignified (that part which is symbolic) and the Efficient (the way things actually work and get done), and called the Efficient "Cabinet Government".

Members of the Cabinet are collectively seen as responsible for government policy, a policy termed cabinet collective responsibility. All Cabinet decisions are made by consensus, a vote is rarely taken in a Cabinet meeting. All ministers, whether senior and in the Cabinet, or junior ministers, must support the policy of the government publicly regardless of any private reservations. When a Cabinet reshuffle is imminent, a lot of time is taken up in the conversations of politicians and in the news media, speculating on who will, or will not, be moved in and out of the Cabinet by the Prime Minister, because the appointment of ministers to the Cabinet, and threat of dismissal from the Cabinet, is the single most powerful constitutional power which a Prime Minister has in the political control of the Government in the Westminster system.

The Official Opposition and other major political parties not in the Government, will mirror the governmental organisation with their own Shadow Cabinet made up of Shadow Ministers.

Bicameral and unicameral parliaments

 

In a Westminster system, some members of parliament are elected by popular vote, while others are appointed. Nearly all Westminster-based parliaments have a lower house with powers based on those of the House of Commons (under various names), comprising local, elected representatives of the people (with the only exception being elected entirely by nationwide Proportional Representation). Most also have a smaller upper house, which is made up of members chosen by various methods:
 Termless appointees, either lifetime or retiring, from successive prime ministers (such as the Senate of Canada)
 Appointees of the premier and the opposition leader (such as the Jamaican Senate)
 Direct election (such as the Australian Senate)
 Election by electoral colleges or sub-national legislatures (such as the Indian Rajya Sabha)
 Hereditary nobility (such as the British House of Lords until the House of Lords Act 1999)
 Any combination of the above (such as the Malaysian Senate)

In the UK, the lower house is the  legislative body, while the upper house practices restraint in exercising its constitutional powers and serves as a consultative body. In other Westminster countries, however, the upper house can sometimes exercise considerable power, as is the case for the Australian Senate.

Some Westminster-derived parliaments are unicameral for two reasons:

 The New Zealand Parliament, Parliament of Queensland, and the parliament of the Canadian province of Quebec have abolished their upper houses.
 The parliaments of all other Canadian provinces, the Parliament of Malta, the Papua New Guinea Parliament, the Legislative Council of Hong Kong and the Israeli Parliament never had upper houses.

Hong Kong, a former British crown colony and currently a special administrative region of the People's Republic of China, has a unicameral Legislative Council. While the Legislative Councils in British Australasian and North American colonies were unelected upper houses and some of them had since abolished themselves, the Legislative Council of Hong Kong has remained the sole chamber and had in 1995 evolved into a fully elected house, yet only part of the seats are returned by universal suffrage. Responsible government was never granted during British colonial rule, and the Governor remained the head of government until the transfer of sovereignty in 1997, when the role was replaced by the Chief Executive. Secretaries had remained to be chosen by the Chief Executive not from the Legislative Council, and their appointments need not be approved by the Legislative Council. Although essentially more presidential than parliamentary, the Legislative Council had inherited many elements of the Westminster system, including parliamentary powers, privileges and immunity, and the right to conduct inquiries, amongst others. Minutes are known as Hansards, and the theme colour of the meeting chamber is red as in other upper houses. Government secretaries and other officials are seated on the right hand side of the President in the chamber. The Chief Executive may dissolve the Legislative Council under certain conditions, and is obliged to resign, e.g., when a re-elected Legislative Council passes again a bill that he or she had refused to sign.

"Washminster system" 

Australian constitutional law is, in many respects, a unique hybrid with influences from the United States Constitution as well as from the traditions and conventions of the Westminster system and some indigenous features. Australia is exceptional because the government faces a fully elected upper house, the Senate, which must be willing to pass all its legislation. Although government is formed in the lower house, the House of Representatives, the support of the Senate is necessary in order to govern.

The Australian Senate is unusual in that it maintains an ability to withhold supply from the government of the day – a power similar to that held in the UK until 1911 by the House of Lords, which has since then been impossible, in the Westminster system. A government that has lost supply is severely restricted in its abilities to act; unless a solution can be negotiated and supply can be restored, such an occurrence would normally trigger a federal  election. Since the governor-general, technically speaking, can dismiss a federal government at any time, loss of supply is sometimes, controversially, considered a suitable trigger for a dismissal. This is controversial because it conflicts with the Westminster tradition of government by a party with the confidence of the lower house (not an upper house like the Senate). Some political scientists have held that the Australian system of government was consciously devised as a blend or hybrid of the Westminster and the United States systems of government, especially since the Australian Senate is a powerful upper house like the US Senate; this notion is expressed in the nickname "the Washminster mutation". The ability of upper houses to block supply also features in the parliaments of most Australian states.

The Australian system has also been referred to as a semi-parliamentary system.

Ceremonies
The Westminster system has a very distinct appearance when functioning, with many British customs incorporated into day-to-day government function. A Westminster-style parliament is usually a long, rectangular room, with two rows of seats and desks on either side. Many chambers connect the opposing rows, either with a perpendicular row of seats and desks at the furthermost point from the Speaker's Chair at the opposite end of the chamber (e.g. UK House of Lords or Israel Knesset) or the rows of chairs and desks are rounded at the end, opposite to the Speaker's Chair (e.g. Australian chambers, Ireland, South Africa, India). The chairs in which both the government and opposition sit, are positioned so that the two rows are facing each other. This arrangement is said to have derived from an early Parliament which was held in a church choir. Traditionally, the opposition parties will sit in one row of seats, and the government party will sit in the other. Of course, sometimes a majority government is so large that it must use the "opposition" seats as well. In the lower house at Westminster (the House of Commons) there are lines on the floor in front of the government and opposition benches that members may cross only when exiting the chamber. 

At one end of the room sits a large chair, for the Speaker of the House. The speaker usually wears black robes, and in some countries, a wig. Robed parliamentary clerks often sit at narrow tables between the two rows of seats, as well. These narrow tables in the centre of the chamber, is usually where ministers or members of the house come to speak.

Other ceremonies sometimes associated with the Westminster system include an annual Speech from the Throne (or equivalent) in which the head of state gives a special address (written by the government) to parliament about what kind of policies to expect in the coming year, and lengthy State Opening of Parliament ceremonies that often involve the presentation of a large ceremonial mace. Some legislatures retain Westminster's colour-coded chambers, with the upper houses associated with the colour red (after the House of Lords) and the lower with green (after the House of Commons). This is the case in India, Australia, Canada, New Zealand, and Barbados.

Current countries
Countries that use variations on the theme of the Westminster system, as of 2023, include the following:

Former countries
The Westminster system was adopted by a number of countries which subsequently evolved or reformed their system of government departing from the original model. In some cases, certain aspects of the Westminster system were retained or codified in their constitutions. For instance South Africa and Botswana, unlike Commonwealth realms or parliamentary republics such as India, have a combined head of state and head of government but the President remains responsible to the lower house of parliament; it elects the President at the beginning of a new Parliament, or when there is a vacancy in the office, or when the sitting President is defeated on a vote of confidence. If the Parliament cannot elect a new President within a short period of time (a week to a month) the lower house is dissolved and new elections are called.

The 1983 constitution abolished the Westminster system in South Africa.
 The  gave up self-government in 1934 and reverted to direct rule from London. Use of the Westminster system resumed in 1949 when Newfoundland became a province of Canada.
The 1987 constitution abolished the Westminster system.
  following the end of British colonial rule in 1960, which resulted in the appointment of a Governor-General and then a President, Nnamdi Azikiwe. The system ended with the military coup of 1966.
  following independence in 1948 until the 1962 military coup d'état.
  between 1957 and 1960, then 1969 and 1972.
  State of Somaliland used the Westminster system during its brief independence in 1960, with Muhammad Haji Ibrahim Egal as its first and only Prime Minister.
  (now Eswatini) between 1968 and 1973.
  between 1961 and 1962.
  between 1961 and 1971.
  between 1962 and 1963.
  between 1945 and 1966.
  between 1963 and 1964.
  between 1964 and 1966.
  between 1965 and 1970.
  between 1966 and 1980.
  between 1890 and 1940, under the Meiji Constitution the Diet of Japan was a bicameral legislature modelled after both the German Reichstag and the Westminster system. Influence from the Westminster system remained in Japan's Postwar Constitution.

See also
 Bill of Rights 1689
 English Civil War
 Glorious Revolution
 His Majesty's Government
 History of parliamentarism

 History of the constitution of the United Kingdom § Worldwide influence

 Loyal opposition
 Magna Carta
 Parliamentary system 
 Parliament in the Making
 Parliament of England
 Petition of Right
 Presidential system
Representation of the People Act

References

Bibliography
 
 
 The English Constitution, Walter Bagehot, 1876. . .
 British Cabinet Government, Simon James, Pub Routledge, 1999. .
 Prime Minister & Cabinet Government, Neil MacNaughton, 1999. .
 Westminster Legacies: Democracy and Responsible Government in Asia and the Pacific, Haig Patapan, John Wanna, Patrick Weller, 2005. .

External links
 How the Westminster parliamentary system was exported around the world University of Cambridge.
 Module on Parliamentary Democracy Commonwealth Parliamentary Association.
 The Twilight of Westminster? Electoral Reform & its Consequences, Pippa Norris, 2000.
 Westminster in the Caribbean: History, Legacies, Challenges University College London.
 What is the Westminster System? Parliament of Victoria video.

 
Constitution of the United Kingdom
Constitution of Canada
Constitution of Australia
Constitution of New Zealand
Political systems
Western culture